Boris Kopitović (Montenegrin Cyrillic: Борис Копитовић; born 17 September 1994) is a Montenegrin professional footballer who plays as a defender for Javor. He's a member of Montenegro national team.

Club career

Early career
Born in Podgorica, Montenegro, FR Yugoslavia, Kopitović played for Zabjelo, Budućnost, Israeli club Hapoel Acre, and Mladost Podgorica before coming to Serbia during winter break of 2016–17 season to join Čukarički.

Čukarički
In December 2016, Kopitović signed a three-year contract with Čukarički. Over the course of two full seasons and half of a third, he played a total of 69 games for Čukarički, scoring a total of six goals.

BATE Borisov
In August 2019, Kopitović signed a 3.5-year contract with BATE Borisov in a €300,000 transfer from Čukarički.

Vojvodina 
In 26 August 2021, Kopitović signed a 3-year contract with Serbian SuperLiga club Vojvodina.

International career
Kopitović represented Montenegro in U17, U19, U21, before debuting for Montenegro national team in a June 2018 friendly match against Slovenia.

International goals
Scores and results list Montenegro's goal tally first.

References

External links

1994 births
Living people
Footballers from Podgorica
Association football central defenders
Montenegrin footballers
Montenegro youth international footballers
Montenegro under-21 international footballers
Montenegro international footballers
FK Budućnost Podgorica players
FK Zabjelo players
Hapoel Acre F.C. players
OFK Titograd players
FK Čukarički players
FC BATE Borisov players
FK Vojvodina players
Montenegrin First League players
Montenegrin Second League players
Israeli Premier League players
Serbian SuperLiga players
Belarusian Premier League players
Montenegrin expatriate footballers
Expatriate footballers in Israel
Montenegrin expatriate sportspeople in Israel
Expatriate footballers in Serbia
Montenegrin expatriate sportspeople in Serbia
Expatriate footballers in Belarus
Montenegrin expatriate sportspeople in Belarus
FK Javor Ivanjica players